Habahe County as the official romanized name, also transliterated from Uyghur as Kaba County, is a county situated in the far north of the Xinjiang Uyghur Autonomous Region and is under the administration of the Altay Prefecture. The Postcode is 836700.

Administrative divisions 
Town ( / بازارلىق‎ / قالاشىع‎)
Akeqi (ئاقچى بازىرى , اقشي قالاشىعى), Sarbulaq Town ( / ساربۇلاق بازىرى / ساربۇلاق قالاشىعى)

Township ( / يېزا / اۋىل)
Sartam Township ( / سارتام يېزىسى / سارتام اۋىلى), Jayilma Township ( / جايىلما يېزىسى / جايىلما اۋىلى), Kölbay Township ( / كۆلباي يېزىسى / كولباي اۋىلى)), Terekti Township ( / تېرېكتى يېزىسى /  تەرەكتى اۋىلى), Qibar Township ( / چىبار يېزىسى / شىبار اۋىلى)

Others
XPCC No. 185 ( / 185-تۇەن مەيدانى)

Demographics

Climate

References

External links 

County-level divisions of Xinjiang
Altay Prefecture